Dolon Roy (also spelt as Dolon Ray) is a Bengali actress, based in Kolkata, India.

Early life
She was born in Kolkata to Dilip and Dipika Roy. Roy graduated from the Charuchandra College and subsequently earned a postgraduate degree in science from the University of Calcutta. She is the wife of actor Dipankar Dey, who is 21 years older, married in 2020.

Filmography

Television

Awards 
National Film Award – Special Jury Award / Special Mention (Feature Film) her performance in the 1996 film "Sanghat" directed by Pinaki Choudhury.

References

Living people
Bengali actresses
Actresses in Bengali cinema
Actresses from Kolkata
Charuchandra College alumni
University of Calcutta alumni
Indian film actresses
Indian television actresses
Bengali television actresses
21st-century Indian actresses
Special Mention (feature film) National Film Award winners
Year of birth missing (living people)